Arizona diamond rattlesnake is a common name that may refer to either of the following species:

 Crotalus atrox, a.k.a. the western diamondback rattlesnake.
 Crotalus oreganus, a.k.a. the western rattlesnake.